Jesús Tiamo (born January 1, 1961) is a Venezuelan coach in Minor League Baseball (MiLB), for the DSL Phillies.  He served as the bullpen catcher for the Philadelphia Phillies, a position he held from 2009–2017. Tiamo wore uniform number 81. In 2018, he became a coach for the DSL Phillies Red Team.

Tiamo graduated from Liceo Pedro María Freite, where he played both volleyball and baseball.

Playing career
In 1981, Tiamo hit .267 with five home runs, 75 RBI, and 13 stolen bases for the Greenwood Pirates. In 1983, he hit .261 with three home runs and 43 RBI for Greenwood. In total, Tiamo hit .268/.318/.371 with 8 home runs, 20 stolen bases, and 137 RBI in 988 at bats. He played 77 games at catcher and 36 games at first base.

Thereafter, Tiamo spent seven seasons with Navegantes del Magallanes of the Venezuelan Professional Baseball League. He played Venezuelan winter ball in 11 offseasons for four different teams: Magallanes (1980-1887), Zulia (1988), Lara (1989), and Oriente (1990).

Tiamo played for the Venezuela national baseball team in the 1979 Pan American Games.

Coaching career
Prior to serving as the Phillies' bullpen catcher, Tiamo coached in the minor leagues for the Chicago White Sox from 1995 to 1999, the New York Mets from 2000 to 2007, and the Phillies in 2008 (as a coach in the Venezuelan Summer League).

Tiamo first served as the Phillies bullpen catcher in 2009. In 2016, at the age of 55, he was the oldest bullpen catcher in the major leagues.

Tiamo was named the catching coach for the DSL Phillies for the 2018 season.

References

External links

Jesús Tiamo at Pura Pelota (Venezuelan Professional Baseball League)

Living people
1961 births
Minor league baseball coaches
Gulf Coast Pirates players
Greenwood Pirates players
Navegantes del Magallanes players
Major League Baseball bullpen catchers
People from Puerto la Cruz